Iulota is a genus of moths in the family Gelechiidae.

Species
 Iulota epispila (Lower, 1897)
 Iulota bacillum (Turner, 1927)
 Iulota ischnora Turner, 1919
 Iulota ithyxyla Meyrick, 1904
 Iulota ochropolia Turner, 1939
 Iulota phauloptila Turner, 1919
 Iulota triglossa Meyrick, 1904

References

 
Anomologini